() is an antiqua typeface designed by  from 1923 to 1928 specifically for the Polish language.

Digitizations
The Polish TeX User's Group  (and ) digitised  using Metafont with four weights (light, normal, medium, bold), italic and upright styles, as well as specific fonts for the 6, 8, 10, 12 and 17 point optical sizes.

Most languages written in the Latin script are supported, among them all such European languages as well as some other languages such as Vietnamese and Navajo.

The  fonts are available free of charge under the terms of the  Font License.

References

Notes

External links
GUST 

Typefaces and fonts introduced in 1928
Open-source typefaces